"I Guess I'll Always Love You" is a 1966 single by The Isley Brothers, released on Motown's Tamla label, and is a Holland–Dozier–Holland composition. In the US, the single made both the Hot 100, and R&B singles chart.

The Isleys' version went to number 45 in the United Kingdom, when originally released in September 1966 (TMG 572) and was then reissued again in [[1969 in music|1969] under TMG 683] peaking at number 11, a much bigger hit than it ever was in the United States.

Chart performance

Cover versions
The song was covered by The Supremes for their album titled The Supremes Sing Holland–Dozier–Holland, that was released in 1967 and also featured as the b-side to their single "In and Out of Love" that was released in the same year.

References 

1966 songs
1966 singles
1967 singles
The Isley Brothers songs
The Supremes songs
Songs written by Holland–Dozier–Holland
Motown singles
Song recordings produced by Lamont Dozier
Song recordings produced by Brian Holland